Kathleen Stebe is a scientist with areas of expertise in Nanostructured Materials, as well as Surface and Colloidal Science. She is also a Professor of Chemical and Biomolecular Engineering at The University of Pennsylvania.

Education 

Stebe studied Economics at The City College of New York as an undergraduate. She graduated with a BA in Economics in 1984. Following graduation she began studying in a PhD program at The City University of New York. She completed this program in 1989, obtaining her MSE and PhD in Chemical Engineering under the guidance of Charles Maldarelli.

Career and research 

After graduation from her PhD program, Stebe spent a year in Compiegne, France under Dominique Barthes Biesel. Following her time in France, she became an Assistant Professor of Johns Hopkins University in 1991. In 1996, Stebe was promoted to an Associate Professor, and in 2000 she was given the title of Professor of Chemical and Biomedical Engineering at Johns Hopkins University where she stayed until 2008. After leaving Johns Hopkins, Stebe took on the role of Department Chair of Chemical and Biomolecular Engineering at The University of Pennsylvania. In 2008, she became the Goodwin Professor of Engineering and Applied Science, and in 2012, she was awarded the position of Deputy Dean for Research in the School of Engineering and Applied Science, both positions she still holds today. Stebe's research is mainly focused on directed assembly in soft matter. Another primary research interests is non-equilibrium interfaces, with applications ranging from microfluidics to nanotechnology from an engineering viewpoint.

Honors and awards 
 Elected member of the National Academy of Engineering - 2021
 Elected to the American Academy of Arts and Sciences – 2020
 Society of Scholars – Johns Hopkins University – 2015
 Fellow – Radcliffe Institute for Advanced Study – Harvard University – 2002
 Robert S. Pond Sr. Excellence in Teaching Award – Whiting School of Engineering – Johns Hopkins University – 1993
 American Physical Society Francois N. Frenkiel Award for Significant Contributions in Fluid Mechanics by Young Investigators – 1992
 Stanley Katz Memorial Award for Excellence in Research – Department of Chemical Engineering – City University of New York – 1989

Selected publications

References 

Year of birth missing (living people)
Living people
American chemical engineers
University of Pennsylvania faculty
City College of New York alumni
City University of New York alumni
American women scientists
Fellows of the American Academy of Arts and Sciences
Members of the United States National Academy of Engineering
American women academics
21st-century American women